The Atuel Canyon (in Spanish Cañón del Atuel) is a narrow canyon and popular tourist attraction within Valle Grande, Argentina.  The canyon is popular location for adventure sports, including river rafting, hiking, climbing, horse riding and mountain biking.

The Atuel River flows through the base of the canyon and contains several rapids, which are used for rafting and canoeing.  Those rapids are classified between class II (novice) and IV (advanced) in the International Scale of River Difficulty.

The surrounding area includes many hotels, camping sites, country clubs and other lodging facilities.

Geography
The canyon was formed by river and wind erosion.

External links

References

Geography of Argentina
Tourist attractions in Argentina